= Aguascalientes, Mexico =

Aguascalientes, Mexico, may refer to:

- The state of Aguascalientes, one of the 32 component federal entities of the United Mexican States
- Aguascalientes, Aguascalientes, capital city of that state
